The Jinshui Elementary School was an elementary school in Jincheng Township, Kinmen County, Taiwan.

History
The school building was constructed in 1932. Upon completion, it was the largest western-style elementary school in the county.

Architecture
The school building was designed with traditional academy architectural style.

See also
 Education in Taiwan

References

1932 establishments in Taiwan
Buildings and structures in Kinmen County
Jincheng Township
Primary schools in Taiwan
School buildings completed in 1932
Tourist attractions in Kinmen County